The Sri Lanka Corps of Military Police (SLCMP) is the branch of the Sri Lanka Army responsible for the policing of service personnel and providing a military police presence on service property, operations and exercises. It is made up of three regular regiments and with headquartered at Regiment Center Polhengoda, Colombo. Like other military police around the world, they continue to wear white webbing with barrack dress but white gaiters.

Policing in the Sri Lankan Army is carried out mainly by SLCMP and by the Regimental Police.
The Sri Lanka Navy is policed by the Provost Branch. The Sri Lanka Air Force is policed by the Air Force Police (AFP).

Missions
The Military Police force carries out the following missions:

Ceremonial duties
These ceremonial functions are performed mainly by the President’s Ceremonial Guard Company.
Presidential guard duty includes guard mounting at the President’s House in Colombo and President's Pavilion in Kandy. MPs wear a special ceremonial uniform known as the Presidential scarlet when assigned to the President’s Ceremonial Guard Company. A foot guards type scarlet uniform with assault rifle is worn when mounting the outer-guard and a mounted guard type scarlet long coat with gold girdles, shoulder mail and lance is worn when mounting the inner-guard.
MP's in their ceremonial scarlet uniform provides guard mounting at state and military ceremonies as well as motorcycle honor guards.

Policing missions
 Maintenance of order and a high standard of discipline by provision of garrison police facilities: Consists of monitoring, maintaining and, if necessary, re-establishing discipline and military order. This also involves controlling stragglers and refugees in times of war.
 Traffic control.
 Criminal investigations.

Security missions
 Prevents and deters any threat to or attack against the personnel and property of the armed forces. MPs also provide VIP motorcycle escorts, perform close protection missions, and escort classified documents and money transports.
 Tactical military police support to the Army in all phases of military operations and guarding prisoners of wars.
 Counter-intelligence operations are also carried out by MP's within the army.

History
With the establishment of the Ceylon Army in October 1948, a Provost Section was raised. The section then consisted of 1 officer and 16 NCOs. On 1 October 1951 the establishment was increased to that of a company, and Capt E.R.P De Zilwa was appointed officer commanding. In 1959 the company was elevated to the level of the unit, and the commanding officer was promoted lieutenant colonel.

With the rapid expansion of the army in recent years, the corps has also been gradually increased and has provost sections at every army detachment.

In 1979 the military police had the rare honour of performing the ceremonial guard duties, such as Guard Mounting at the President’s House and to meet this requirement, the President’s Ceremonial Guard Company was formed.

Specialized branches such as the Special Investigations Branch and the Traffic School were included to the establishment by the provost in order to counter various crimes and also misconduct and infringement of road rules on public highways by army personnel. The Special Investigations Branch has now expanded to a Special Investigation Unit, directly functioning under the Directorate of Provost Marshal.

The introduction of the Sri Lanka Army Women’s Corps gave necessity to maintain the discipline of the women soldiers, and the Provost Section of MP Women was established in 1983.

Organization
The overall command of the Corps is exercised by the Directorate of the Provost Marshal (which in turn reports to the Directorate of Personnel Management at Army headquarters) and the Centre Commandant.

In addition, the SLCMP has a Training Centre (established in 2002) at Giritale, commanded by Colonel D.M.A. Bandara, and the Ex-Military Policemen's Association, administered by its President Douglas Walisundara and Secretary, D.U.A. Jayasooriya.

Notable members
Major Basil Henricus
Sergeant Chaminda Ruwan Yakandawala

Order of precedence

See also
 Sri Lanka Army
 Law enforcement in Sri Lanka

External links and sources
 Sri Lanka Army
  Sri Lanka Corps of Military Police

Corps of Military Police
Military Police
Law enforcement agencies of Sri Lanka
Military provosts
Military units and formations established in 1951
1951 establishments in Ceylon